The Ven. Clive Ronald Franklin Cohen (30 January 1946 – 8 April 2019) was an Anglican priest and author.

Cohen was employed by the Midland Bank from 1967 to 1969. He trained at Salisbury and Wells Theological College and was ordained deacon in 1981, and priest in 1982. After a curacy in Esher, Surrey, he was Rector of Winterslow, Wiltshire, from 1985 to 2000. He was Archdeacon of Bodmin from 2000 to 2011.
He was also a member of the Truro Diocesan Board of Finance.

References

1946 births
2019 deaths
Alumni of Salisbury Theological College
Archdeacons of Bodmin